The Thy Line is a  long standard gauge single track railway line in Denmark which runs between Struer and Thisted through the historical region of Thy. 

The railway opened in 1882. It is owned and maintained by Rail Net Denmark and served with passenger trains by Arriva and the Danish State Railways (DSB). From Oddesund the line cuts through the peninsula of Thyholm and continues through Thy to reach Thisted.

External links 

 Banedanmark – government agency responsible for maintenance and traffic control of most of the Danish railway network
 DSB – largest Danish train operating company
 Arriva – British multinational public transport company operating bus and train services in Denmark
 Danske Jernbaner – website with information on railway history in Denmark

References

Notes

Bibliography 
 
 

Railway lines in Denmark
Railway lines opened in 1882
1882 establishments in Denmark
Rail transport in the Central Denmark Region
Rail transport in the North Jutland Region